The men's 50 metre team small-bore rifle (originally called team competition, miniature-rifle) was a shooting sports event held as part of the Shooting at the 1912 Summer Olympics programme. It was the second appearance of the event, with a mixed-distance team small-bore rifle event having been held in 1908. A standing 50 metre team small-bore event would be held in 1920. The competition was held on Wednesday, 3 July 1912.

Twenty-four sport shooters from six nations competed.

Results

References

External links
 
 

Shooting at the 1912 Summer Olympics